The 2000 Crown Prince Cup was the 25th season of the Saudi premier football knockout tournament since its establishment in 1957. It started with the qualifying rounds on 17 February 2000 and concluded with the final on 12 May 2000.

In the final, Al-Hilal defeated defending champions Al-Shabab 3–0 to secure their third title. The final was held at the Prince Abdullah Al-Faisal Stadium in Jeddah for the sixth time. As winners of the tournament, Al-Hilal qualified for the 2001–02 Asian Cup Winners' Cup.

Qualifying rounds
All of the competing teams that are not members of the Premier League competed in the qualifying rounds to secure one of 4 available places in the Round of 16. The qualifying competition began on 17 February 2000. Second Division side Al-Hazem and Third Division sides Al-Maseef, Al-Oyoon and Al-Watani qualified.

First round

Second round

Final Round

Bracket

Round of 16
The draw for the Round of 16 was held on 4 March 2000. The Round of 16 fixtures were played on 28, 29, 30 and 31 March 2000. All times are local, AST (UTC+3).

Quarter-finals
The draw for the Quarter-finals was held on 1 April 2000. The Quarter-finals fixtures were played on 8 and 9 April 2000. All times are local, AST (UTC+3).

Semi-finals
The draw for the Semi-finals was held on 10 April 2000. The Semi-finals fixtures were played on 13 and 14 April 2000. All times are local, AST (UTC+3).

Final
The 2000 Crown Prince Cup Final was played on 12 May 2000 at the Prince Abdullah Al-Faisal Stadium in Jeddah between Al-Hilal and Al-Shabab. This was the sixth Crown Prince Cup final to be held at the stadium. The two sides met once in the final with Al-Shabab winning in 1999. This was a repeat of last season's final. This was Al-Shabab's sixth final and Al-Hilal's fourth final. All times are local, AST (UTC+3).

Top goalscorers

See also
 1999–2000 Saudi Premier League

References

Saudi Crown Prince Cup seasons
2000 domestic association football cups
Crown Prince Cup